The Modern Art of Jazz by Randy Weston (also released as How High the Moon) is a jazz album by American pianist Randy Weston recorded in 1956 and released on the Dawn label.

Reception

Allmusic awarded the album 3 stars, with the review by Scott Yanow stating: "This album does not deserve its obscurity".
The All About Jazz review said that "Randy Weston fans should certainly find this album a valuable peek at an early stage of his career".

Track listing 
All compositions by Randy Weston except as indicated
 "Loose Wig" - 3:01   
 "Run Joe" (Louis Jordan, Walter Merrick, Joe Willoughby) - 3:43   
 "A Theme for Teddy" - 5:41   
 "In a Little Spanish Town" (Sam M. Lewis, Mabel Wayne, Joe Young) - 3:01   
 "Don't Blame Me" (Dorothy Fields, Jimmy McHugh) - 5:18   
 "J. K. Blues" - 4:17   
 "Well, You Needn't" (Thelonious Monk) - 5:01   
 "How High the Moon" (Nancy Hamilton, Morgan Lewis) - 4:49   
 "Stormy Weather" (Harold Arlen, Ted Koehler) - 5:08 Bonus track on CD reissue
Recorded in New York City on November 21 (tracks 2, 4 & 6) and November 22 (tracks 1, 3, 5 & 7-9), 1956

Personnel 
Randy Weston - piano 
Ray Copeland - trumpet (tracks 2, 4 & 6)
Cecil Payne - alto saxophone, baritone saxophone (tracks 2, 4, 6 & 7)
Ahmed Abdul-Malik - bass 
Wilbert Hogan (tracks 2, 4 & 6), Willie Jones (tracks 1, 3, 5 & 7-9) - drums

References 

Randy Weston albums
1956 albums